Figs in the Bible include references to both the tree and its fruit in the Tanakh and the New Testament, which are sometimes symbolic.

Hebrew Bible
The fig tree is the third tree to be mentioned by name in the Hebrew Bible. The first is the Tree of life and the second is the Tree of the knowledge of good and evil. Adam and Eve used the leaves of the fig tree to sew garments for themselves after they ate the "fruit of the Tree of knowledge", when they realized that they were naked.

In Deuteronomy, the Promised Land is described as "a land of wheat and barley, of vines and fig trees and pomegranates, a land of olive oil and honey; a land where you will eat food without scarcity, in which you will not lack anything;". During Solomon's reign Judah and Israel, from Dan to Beersheba, lived in safety, each man "under his own vine and fig tree", an indicator of national wealth and prosperity.  states that Hezekiah rebelled against the King of Assyria, of whom he had become a vassal. In response, the Assyrian commander attempted to sway the army of Jerusalem by offering deserters each his own vine and fig tree.

 likens tending a fig tree to looking after one's master.
There was a fig tree in the garden of the Song of Solomon, and in the year of love the tree formed its fruit early.

The fig tree and figs are featured in the Book of Jeremiah and mentioned briefly in the Book of Micah.

Another species of ficus, the Egyptian sycamore fig is occasionally mentioned as well, for example .

New Testament

The fig tree could be understood as symbolic of Israel .

The parable of the barren fig tree is a parable of Jesus recorded in the Gospel of Luke . A vinekeeper holds out hope that a barren fig tree will bear fruit next year.

Mark  includes an account of Jesus cursing the fig tree:

A parallel is found in Matthew , but the fig tree withers immediately and is noticed at that time by the disciples.

When the apostle Nathanael first encounters Jesus and asks how Jesus knows him, the answer is that He has already seen Nathanael sitting under the fig tree (John ).

New Testament miracles
 
Biblical topics